The All-Amhara People's Organization or AAPO is an ethnic based political party in Ethiopia, created in 1993 by Asrat Woldeyes.

Creation
The All-Amhara People's Organization was created by Asrat Woldeyes in 1993 to try to limit the domination of Ethiopian politics by the Tigray People's Liberation Front (TPLF) that took power after the 1991 overthrow of the dictator Mengistu Haile-Mariam.

2000s
In the federal elections on 15 May 2005, the party was part of the United Ethiopian Democratic Forces, that won 52 out of 527 seats in the Council of People's Representatives.

References

See also
All Ethiopian Unity Party

Ethnic political parties in Ethiopia
Political parties in Ethiopia